Rafiq’s racerunner (Eremias rafiqi) is a species of lizard found in Iran.

References

Eremias
Reptiles described in 2022